The Royal Danish Embassy in Beijing is Denmark's foremost diplomatic mission in the People's Republic of China. The embassy is located on 1 Dong Wu Jie, San li Tun, in the Chaoyang district of Beijing.

Denmark recognized the People's Republic of China on January 9, 1950 and diplomatic relations between Denmark and People's Republic of China was established on May 11, 1950. Denmark was the first Western country to recognize the People's Republic of China. 
The current embassy compound was finished in June 1974 and is designed by the famous Danish architect, Gehrdt Bornebusch  It contains the ambassador's residence as well as offices for the more than 60 employees situated in the embassy.

The Royal Danish Embassy in Beijing is the largest Danish diplomatic mission in the world with more than 60 employees. The embassy's primary tasks are:

To ensure that the Chinese-Danish diplomatic relations are maintained and optimized. 
To provide assistance to optimize Denmark's commercial interests in China (see Trade Council). 
To raise awareness of Danish culture as well as ensuring that the education and career opportunities which the Denmark provides are communicated to the Chinese population (see Public Diplomacy events). 
To provide visa and consular services for Chinese citizens as well as providing prompt and effective assistance to Danes in China.

Trade council
The promotion of Danish commercial interests in China is done through the embassy's Trade Council. The Trade Council's job is to strengthen the Danish export efforts and promote investment activities between Denmark and China. The trade council assists companies with everything from strategic planning to legal counselling, market research, visit programs and public affairs, functioning as companies' bridge between Denmark and China.

Public diplomacy events
In order to communicate Danish culture to China and to raise awareness of the opportunities Denmark provides for Chinese citizens with regards to for instance education and career, the Danish embassy hosts various Public Diplomacy events. Examples of these are Open Denmark Day where more than 3,800 Chinese citizens and journalists were invited to visit the embassy to experience various sides to Danish culture, as well as Climate Race, a cycling race through Beijing promoting Danish cycling and green culture. Climate Race and Open Denmark Day have both been nominated for the PR Asia award.

List of Danish ambassadors to China
1912-1920 – Preben F. Ahlefeldt-Laurvig
1921-1923 – Janus F. Øiesen
1924-1932 – Henrik Kauffmann
1932-1939 – :dk:Oscar O'Neill Oxholm (diplomat)
1940-1946 – Hialmar Collin
1946-1953 – Alex Mørch
1953-1959 – Aage Gregersen
1959-1962 – Hans Bertelsen
1962-1965 – Anker Svart
1965-1968 – Troels Oldenburg
1968-1972 - Jørn Stenbæk Hansen
1972-1976 - Janus A.W. Paludan
1976-1980 – Kjeld Vilhelm Mortensen
1980-1983 – Rudolph A. Thorning Petersen
1983-1986 – Flemming Hedegaard
1986-1991 – Arne Belling
1991-1994 – William Friis-Møller
1995-2001 – Christopher Bo Bramsen
2001-2004 – Ole Lønsmann Poulsen
2004-2007 – Laurids Mikaelsen
2007-2010 – Jeppe Tranholm-Mikkelsen
2010-2015 – Friis Arne Petersen
2015 to now Anders Carsten Damsgaard

Other Danish representations in China
Royal Danish Consulate General in Chongqing
Royal Danish Consulate General in Guangzhou
Royal Danish Consulate General in Shanghai
Innovation Centre Denmark in Shanghai
The Trade Council of Denmark in Taipei

See also
China–Denmark relations

References

Denmark
Beijing
China–Denmark relations
Government agencies established in 1912